The Mission Times Courier is a monthly community newspaper published in San Diego, California, by Mission Publishing Group, LLC. The newspaper was founded May 11, 1995, by Sally and Jim Madaffer. On July 1, 2014, it was purchased by David Mannis, publisher of the San Diego Community News Network, Inc. In April of 2019 the paper was sold to Julie Main, publisher of the San Diego Community Newspaper Group.     

The Mission Times Courier carries news of local community interest covering the San Diego communities of Mission Gorge, Mission Trails, Fletcher Hills, Allied Gardens, Del Cerro, Grantville, Rolando, San Carlos and surrounding areas.    

Approximately 4,800 Mission Times Courier newspapers are distributed to over 120 high-traffic locations. An additional 21,000 copies are directly delivered door-to-door to homes in these communities.

San Diego Press Club Awards

 Non-Daily Newspapers Feature Layout: Mission Times Courier, for Happy 50th Birthday Allied Gardens

Publishers
 Sally Ortega Madaffer and Jim Madaffer, 1995–2010
 Jim Madaffer, 2010–2014
 David Mannis, 2014–2019
Julie Main, 20-19-present

References

External links 
The Mission Times Courier website

Newspapers published in San Diego
Companies based in San Diego